Woolley Green is a village to the west of Maidenhead in the county of Berkshire, England.

Location
Woolley Green is a ribbon development along Cherry Garden Lane in the extreme north-east corner of the civil parish of White Waltham in Berkshire. It sits just south of the Bath Road, immediately to the west of Junction 9b of the A404(M) and east of Littlewick Green. It is surrounded, on the north and west, by Maidenhead Thicket. The hamlet of Altwood adjoins it to the south.

Buildings
Interesting buildings in Woolley include Feens Farm, Woolley Hall and Woolley Grange. Feens Farm is the old manor house of Woolley Fiennes. It is said to be haunted by a Roman hunting dog, the 'Black Dog of Feens'. Woolley Hall became the manor house when it was built in the 1780s.

References

Villages in Berkshire
White Waltham